Wahaha may refer to:

Wahaha, food and beverages brand in China belonging to Hangzhou Wahaha Group
Wahaha Joint Venture Company, a joint venture company between Hangzhou Wahaha Group and Groupe Danone
"Wahaha" (song), a 2007 song by Japanese band Kanjani Eight